Wesley Ryan Harris (born September 22, 1986) is an economist and Democratic member of the North Carolina House of Representatives. He has represented the State's 105th district (including constituents in southwestern Mecklenburg County) since 2019.

Career
Harris won the election on November 6, 2018 from the platform of Democratic Party. He secured fifty-two percent of the vote while his closest rival incumbent Republican Scott Stone secured forty-eight percent. He was re-elected in 2020, defeating Republican challenger Amy Bynum.

On March 13, 2023, Harris announced a run for North Carolina State Treasurer.

Committee assignments

2021-2022 Session
Education - Universities 
Finance 
Judiciary III 
Marine Resources and Aqua Culture 
Transportation

2019-2020 Session
Finance 
Judiciary 
Transportation 
Homeland Security, Military, and Veterans Affairs Committee

Electoral history

2022

2020

2018

References

Living people
1986 births
People from Charlotte, North Carolina
Politicians from Charlotte, North Carolina
University of North Carolina at Chapel Hill alumni
Clemson University alumni
21st-century American politicians
Democratic Party members of the North Carolina House of Representatives